The Scrooby Congregation were English Protestant separatists who lived near Scrooby, on the outskirts of Bawtry, a small market town at the border of South Yorkshire, Lincolnshire and Nottinghamshire. In 1607/8 the Congregation emigrated to the Netherlands in search of the freedom to worship as they chose. They founded the "English separatist church at Leiden", one of several English separatist groups in the Netherlands at the time.

History
Richard Clyfton was rector of Babworth, from 1605 under suspicion of nonconformity. Suspended, he continued to preach at Bawtry, near Scrooby though just over the county boundary in Yorkshire. From 1606 the congregation around Clyfton met in the house of William Brewster. This manor house has been identified as on the site of the old Scrooby Palace of the archbishops of York, though much of the older building had been demolished by then. In 1607 Clyfton was excommunicated; at this time he had already met William Bradford.

John Robinson from Sturton le Steeple, also in northern Nottinghamshire, had lost his pulpit for his views and returned home by about the end of 1604; he made contact with separatist groups in Gainsborough, just over the eastern county boundary in Lincolnshire, as well as Scrooby. The minister at Gainsborough was John Smyth. In this way the two separatist churches were drawn together, with Robinson assuming authority in the Scrooby congregation alongside Clyfton after a process of ordination.

Emigration
From the end of 1607 and into 1608 the Gainsborough-Scrooby separatist group emigrated to Holland, in waves. An important organizer of the move was Thomas Helwys of Smyth's congregation, who had moved away to Basford, Nottinghamshire before coming to attention for not taking communion. The emigrants went to Amsterdam and Leiden.

At Leiden
After arriving at Holland they realized that as foreigners, they could only take unskilled jobs and were exempt from working organizations. The congregation also noticed that their children were growing up more Dutch than English. The Congregation decided to emigrate to the Americas, where their children could be English, and they could worship freely.

Historiography
The exact significance of Scrooby for the Pilgrim group is still debated. The first research on the congregation was published by the antiquarian Joseph Hunter in 1849. It was followed in 1853 by a popular book from William Henry Bartlett, a topographical artist. Henry Martyn Dexter (Henry Morton Dexter) wrote the authoritative account The England and Holland of the Pilgrims (1905). Further documentary evidence was found by Walter Herbert Burgess (1867–1943) and Ronald Marchant.  See also Sandra Goodall, "Beyond Bradford's Journal: The Scrooby Puritans in Context," Ph.D. Dissertation, August, 2015, Arizona State University.

See also
Pilgrims (Plymouth Colony)

Notes

References 
Alan Brinkley, American History, a Survey (eleventh edition)

 
Bassetlaw District
Plymouth Colony
Scrooby